was a town located in Tamura District, Fukushima Prefecture, Japan.

On March 1, 2005, Ōgoe, along with the towns of Funehiki, Takine, and Tokiwa, and the village of Miyakoji (all from Tamura District), was merged to create the city of Tamura.

As of 2003, the town had an estimated population of 5,613 and a density of 153.11 persons per km². The total area was 36.66 km².

External links
 Official website of Tamura 

Dissolved municipalities of Fukushima Prefecture
Tamura, Fukushima